Goya is a surname. Notable people with the surname include:

Chantal Goya (born 1942), French singer and actress
Estanislao Goya (born 1988), Argentine professional golfer
Francis Goya (born 1946), born Francis Weyer, Belgian romantic guitarist and composer
Francisco Goya (1746–1828), Spanish romantic painter and printmaker
Nand Lal Goya (1633–1713), Persian and Arabic poet in the Punjab region. Goya was a title conferred on Bhai Nand Lal by Sri Guru Gobind Singh and it means one who is eloquent with words.
Safeway Goya, born Fred de Rafols, American musician, lead singer of The Nobodys
Tito Goya (1951–1985), Puerto Rican actor

Basque-language surnames